The men's K-4 1000 metres canoeing event at the 2011 Pan American Games was held on October 27 at the Canoe & Rowing Course in Ciudad Guzman.

Schedule
All times are local Central Daylight Time (UTC−5)

Results

Final

References

Canoeing at the 2011 Pan American Games